(Devanagari: पाणिनि) was a Sanskrit philologist, grammarian, and revered scholar in ancient India, variously dated between the 6th and 4th century BCE.

Since the discovery and publication of his work Aṣṭādhyāyī by European scholars in the nineteenth century, Pāṇini has been considered the "first descriptive linguist", and even labelled as “the father of linguistics”. His approach to grammar was influential on such foundational linguists as Ferdinand de Saussure and Leonard Bloomfield.

Legacy
Pāṇini is known for his text Aṣṭādhyāyī, a sutra-style treatise on Sanskrit grammar, 3,996 verses or rules on linguistics, syntax and semantics in "eight chapters" which is the foundational text of the Vyākaraṇa branch of the Vedanga, the auxiliary scholarly disciplines of the Vedic period. His aphoristic text attracted numerous bhashya (commentaries), of which Patanjali's Mahābhāṣya is the most famous. His ideas influenced and attracted commentaries from scholars of other Indian religions such as Buddhism.

Pāṇini's analysis of noun compounds still forms the basis of modern linguistic theories of compounding in Indian languages. Pāṇini's comprehensive and scientific theory of grammar is conventionally taken to mark the start of Classical Sanskrit. His systematic treatise inspired and made Sanskrit the preeminent Indian language of learning and literature for two millennia.

Pāṇini's theory of morphological analysis was more advanced than any equivalent Western theory before the 20th century. His treatise is generative and descriptive, uses metalanguage and meta-rules, and has been compared to the Turing machine wherein the logical structure of any computing device has been reduced to its essentials using an idealized mathematical model.

Date and context

Pāṇini likely lived in Śalatura in ancient Gandhāra in the northwest Indian subcontinent during the Mahājanapada era.

The name Pāṇini is a patronymic meaning descendant of Paṇina. His full name was Dakṣiputra Pāṇini according to verses 1.75.13 and 3.251.12 of Patanjali's Mahābhāṣya, with the first part suggesting his mother's name was Dakṣi.

Dating
Nothing definite is known about when Pāṇini lived, not even in which century he lived. Pāṇini has been dated between the seventh or sixth and fourth century BCE. Von Hinüber (1989) based on numismatic arguments and Falk (1993) based on his Indic script studies, place him in mid-fourth century BCE. Others use internal evidence and textual evidence in ancient Indian texts to date him in the sixth or fifth century BCE, while Bod mentions the seventh to fifth century BCE. George Cardona (1997) in his authoritative survey and review of Pāṇini-related studies, states that the available evidence strongly supports a dating no later than between 400 and 350 BCE, while earlier dating depends on interpretations and is not probative.

According to Bod, Pāṇini's grammar defines Classical Sanskrit, so Pāṇini is chronologically placed in the later part of the Vedic period. According to A. B. Keith, the Sanskrit text that most matches the language described by Pāṇini is the Aitareya Brāhmaṇa. According to Scharfe, "his proximity to the Vedic language as found in the Upanisads and Vedic sūtras suggests the 5th or maybe 6th c. B.C."

Based on numismatic findings, Von Hinüber and Falk place Pāṇini in the mid-4th century BCE. Pāṇini's rupya (A 5.2.119, A 5.2.120, A. 5.4.43, A 4.3.153,) mentions a specific gold coin, the niṣka, in several sutra, which was introduced in India in the 4th-century BCE. According to Houben, "the date of " for Pāṇini is thus based on concrete evidence which till now has not been refuted." According to Bronkhorst, there is no reason to doubt the validity of Von Hinüber's and Falk's argument, setting the terminus post quem for the date of Pāṇini at 350 BCE or the decades thereafter.  According to Bronkhorst, 

Cardona mentions two major pieces of internal evidence for the dating of Pāṇini. The occurrence of the word  in 4.1.49, referring to a writing (lipi) c.q. cuneiform writing, or to Greek writing, suggests a date for Pāṇini after Alexander the Great. Cardona rejects this possibility, arguing that  may also refer to a Yavana woman; and that Indians had contacts with the Greek world before Alexander's conquests. Sutra 2.1.70 of Pāṇini mentions kumāraśramaṇa, derived from śramaṇa, which refers to a female renunciates, c.q. "Buddhist nuns," implying that Pāṇini should be placed after Gautama Buddha. K. B. Pathak (1930) argued that kumāraśramaṇa could also refer to a Jain nun, meaning that Pāṇini is not necessarily to be placed after the Buddha.

It is not certain whether Pāṇini used writing for the composition of his work, though it is generally agreed that he knew of a form of writing, based on references to words such as lipi ("script") and lipikara ("scribe") in section 3.2 of the  Aṣṭādhyāyī. The dating of the introduction of writing in India may therefore give further information on the dating of Pāṇini.

Pāṇini cites at least ten grammarians and linguists before him: Āpiśali, Kāśyapa, Gārgya, Gālava, Cākravarmaṇa, Bhāradvāja, Śākaṭāyana, Śākalya, Senaka and Sphoṭāyana. According to Kamal K. Misra, Pāṇini also refers to Yaska, "whose writings date back to the middle of the 4th century B.C." Both Brihatkatha and Mañjuśrī-mūla-kalpa mention Pāṇini to have been a contemporary with the Nanda king (4th c. BCE).

Location
Nothing certain is known about Pāṇini's personal life. In an inscription of Siladitya VII of Valabhi, he is called Śalāturiya, which means "man from Salatura". This means Panini lived in Salatura of ancient Gandhara (present day north-west Pakistan), which likely was near Lahor, a town at the junction of Indus and Kabul rivers. According to the memoirs of 7th-century Chinese scholar Xuanzang, there was a town called Suoluoduluo on the Indus where Pāṇini was born, and he composed the Qingming-lun (Sanskrit: Vyākaraṇa).

According to Hartmut Scharfe, Pāṇini lived in Gandhara close to the borders of the Achaemenid Empire, and Gandhara was then an Achaemenian satrapy following the Achaemenid conquest of the Indus Valley. He must, therefore, have been technically a Persian subject but his work shows no awareness of the Persian language. According to Patrick Olivelle, Pāṇini's text and references to him elsewhere suggest that "he was clearly a northerner, probably from the northwestern region".

Legends and later reception
Panini is mentioned in Indian fables and ancient texts. The Panchatantra, for example, mentions that Pāṇini was killed by a lion.

Pāṇini was depicted on a five-rupee Indian postage stamp in August, 2004.

Aṣṭādhyāyī

The most important of Pāṇini's works, the Aṣṭādhyāyī is a grammar that essentially defines the Sanskrit language. Modelled on the dialect and register of elite speakers in his time, the text also accounts for some features of the older Vedic language.

The Aṣtādhyāyī is a prescriptive and generative grammar with algebraic rules governing every aspect of the language. It is supplemented by three ancillary texts: akṣarasamāmnāya, dhātupāṭha and gaṇapāṭha.

Growing out of a centuries-long effort to preserve the language of the Vedic hymns from "corruption", the Aṣtādhyāyī is the high point of a vigorous, sophisticated grammatical tradition devised to arrest language change. The Aṣtādhyāyī's preeminence is underlined by the fact that it eclipsed all similar works that came before: while not the first, it is the oldest such text surviving in its entirety.

The Aṣṭādhyāyī consists of 3,959 sūtras in eight chapters, which are each subdivided into four sections or pādas. The text takes material from lexical lists (dhātupāṭha, gaṇapātha) as input and describes algorithms to be applied to them for the generation of well-formed words. Such is its intricacy that the correct application of its rules and metarules is still being worked out centuries later.

The Aṣṭādhyāyī, composed in an era when oral composition and transmission was the norm, is staunchly embedded in that oral tradition. In order to ensure wide dissemination, Pāṇini is said to have preferred brevity over clarity - it can be recited end-to-end in two hours. This has led to the emergence of a great number of commentaries of his work over the centuries, which for the most part adhere to the foundations laid by Pāṇini's work.

Bhaṭṭikāvya

The learning of Indian curriculum in late classical times had at its heart a system of grammatical study and linguistic analysis. The core text for this study was the Aṣṭādhyāyī of Pāṇini, the sine qua non of learning. This grammar of Pāṇini had been the object of intense study for the ten centuries prior to the composition of the Bhaṭṭikāvya. It was plainly Bhaṭṭi's purpose to provide a study aid to Pāṇini's text by using the examples already provided in the existing grammatical commentaries in the context of the gripping and morally improving story of the Rāmāyaṇa. To the dry bones of this grammar Bhaṭṭi has given juicy flesh in his poem. The intention of the author was to teach this advanced science through a relatively easy and pleasant medium. In his own words:

This composition is like a lamp to those who perceive the meaning of words and like a hand mirror for a blind man to those without grammar.

This poem, which is to be understood by means of a commentary, is a joy to those sufficiently learned: through my fondness for the scholar I have here slighted the dullard.

Bhaṭṭikāvya 22.33–34.

Modern linguistics
Pāṇini's work became known in 19th-century Europe, where it influenced modern linguistics initially through Franz Bopp, who mainly looked at Pāṇini.  Subsequently, a wider body of work influenced Sanskrit scholars such as Ferdinand de Saussure, Leonard Bloomfield, and Roman Jakobson. Frits Staal (1930–2012) discussed the impact of Indian ideas on language in Europe. After outlining the various aspects of the contact, Staal notes that the idea of formal rules in language – proposed by Ferdinand de Saussure in 1894 and developed by Noam Chomsky in 1957 – has origins in the European exposure to the formal rules of Pāṇinian grammar. In particular, de Saussure, who lectured on Sanskrit for three decades, may have been influenced by Pāṇini and Bhartrihari; his idea of the unity of signifier-signified in the sign somewhat resembles the notion of Sphoṭa. More importantly, the very idea that formal rules can be applied to areas outside of logic or mathematics may itself have been catalysed by Europe's contact with the work of Sanskrit grammarians.

De Saussure
Pāṇini, and the later Indian linguist Bhartrihari, had a significant influence on many of the foundational ideas proposed by Ferdinand de Saussure, professor of Sanskrit, who is widely considered the father of modern structural linguistics and with Charles S. Peirce on the other side, to semiotics, although the concept Saussure used was semiology. Saussure himself cited Indian grammar as an influence on some of his ideas. In his Mémoire sur le système primitif des voyelles dans les langues indo-européennes (Memoir on the Original System of Vowels in the Indo-European Languages) published in 1879, he mentions Indian grammar as an influence on his idea that "reduplicated aorists represent imperfects of a verbal class." In his De l'emploi du génitif absolu en sanscrit (On the Use of the Genitive Absolute in Sanskrit) published in 1881, he specifically mentions Pāṇini as an influence on the work.

Prem Singh, in his foreword to the reprint edition of the German translation of Pāṇini's Grammar in 1998, concluded that the "effect Panini's work had on Indo-European linguistics shows itself in various studies" and that a "number of seminal works come to mind," including Saussure's works and the analysis that "gave rise to the laryngeal theory," further stating: "This type of structural analysis suggests influence from Panini's analytical teaching." George Cardona, however, warns against overestimating the influence of Pāṇini on modern linguistics: "Although Saussure also refers to predecessors who had taken this Paninian rule into account, it is reasonable to conclude that he had a direct acquaintance with Panini's work. As far as I am able to discern upon rereading Saussure's Mémoire, however, it shows no direct influence of Paninian grammar. Indeed, on occasion, Saussure follows a path that is contrary to Paninian procedure."

Leonard Bloomfield
The founding father of American structuralism, Leonard Bloomfield, wrote a 1927 paper titled "On some rules of Pāṇini".

Rishi Rajpopat
Rishi Rajpopat elaborated in 2021 in his PhD thesis a deeper understanding of Panini's "language machine" by designing a simple system of resolving rule conflicts.

Comparison with modern formal systems
Pāṇini's grammar is the world's first formal system, developed well before the 19th century innovations of Gottlob Frege and the subsequent development of mathematical logic. In designing his grammar, Pāṇini used the method of "auxiliary symbols", in which new affixes are designated to mark syntactic categories and the control of grammatical derivations. This technique, rediscovered by the logician Emil Post, became a standard method in the design of computer programming languages. Sanskritists now accept that Pāṇini's linguistic apparatus is well-described as an "applied" Post system.  Considerable evidence shows ancient mastery of context-sensitive grammars, and a general ability to solve many complex problems. Frits Staal has written that "Panini is the Indian Euclid."

Other works

Two literary works are attributed to Pāṇini, though they are now lost.
 Jāmbavati Vijaya is a lost work cited by Rajashekhara in Jalhana's Sukti Muktāvalī. A fragment is to be found in Ramayukta's commentary on Namalinganushasana. From the title it may be inferred that the work dealt with Krishna's winning of Jambavati in the underworld as his bride. Rajashekhara in Jahlana's Sukti Muktāvalī:
 नमः पाणिनये तस्मै यस्मादाविर भूदिह।
 आदौ व्याकरणं काव्यमनु जाम्बवतीजयम्॥ namaḥ pāṇinaye tasmai yasmādāvirabhūdiha।
 ādau vyākaraṇaṃ kāvyamanu jāmbavatījayam॥
 Ascribed to Pāṇini, Pātāla Vijaya is a lost work cited by Namisadhu in his commentary on Kavyalankara of Rudrata.

There are many mathematical works related to Pāṇini's works. Pāṇini came up with a plethora of ideas to organize the known grammatical forms of his day in a systematic way. Like any mathematician who models a known phenomenon in mathematical language, Pāṇini created a metalanguage and it is very close to the modern-day ideas of algebra. See "Mathematical Structures of Panini's Ashtaadhyayi" by Bhaskar Kompella.

See also

Vyākaraṇa
Bhaṭṭikāvya
Pingala
Mahajanapadas
Seṭ and aniṭ roots
Tolkāppiyam
List of Indian mathematicians

Notes

Glossary

Traditional glossary and notes

References

Bibliography

Bhate, S. and Kak, S. (1993) Panini and Computer Science. Annals of the Bhandarkar Oriental Research Institute, vol. 72, pp. 79–94.

 Ingerman suggests that the then-called Backus normal form be renamed to the Pāṇini–Backus form, to give due credit to Pāṇini as the earliest independent inventor.

T. R. N. Rao. Pāṇini-backus form of languages. 1998.

Tiwary, Kapil Muni 1968 Pāṇini's description of nominal compounds, University of Pennsylvania doctoral dissertation, unpublished.

Further reading
Works
 Pāṇini. Ashtādhyāyī. Book 4. Translated by Chandra Vasu. Benares, 1896. 
 Pāṇini. Ashtādhyāyī. Book 6–8. Translated by Chandra Vasu. Benares, 1897. 
Pāṇini
  2000.
Pāṇini - His work and its traditions, George Cardona. 1997.

External links

PaSSim – Paninian Sanskrit Simulator simulates the Pāṇinian Process of word formation
The system of Panini
Gaṇakāṣṭādhyāyī, a software on Sanskrit grammar, based on Pāṇini's Sutras
 Ashtadhyayi, Work by Pāṇini
Forizs, L. Pāṇini, Nāgārjuna and Whitehead – The Relevance of Whitehead for Contemporary Buddhist Philosophy
The Aṣṭādhyāyī of Pāṇini, with the Mahābhāṣya and Kāśikā commentaries, along with the Nyāsa and Padamanjara commentaries on the Kāśikā. (PDF) Sanskrit.
Pāṇinian Linguistics

6th-century BC writers
5th-century BC writers
Ancient Indian mathematicians
Ancient Sanskrit grammarians
Vyakarana
Morphologists
5th-century BC mathematicians
Ancient Indian grammar works